College Success Foundation is an educational nonprofit headquartered in Bellevue, Washington, serving school districts in Washington state and the District of Columbia. The organization serves disenfranchised students, first-generation college students, students of color, low-income students and foster youth.

History
The foundation was formed in 2000 as the Washington Education Foundation by two former members of the state's Higher Education Coordinating Board,  Bob Craves  and Ann Ramsay-Jenkins, under the terms of the Washington State 2020 Commission on the Future of Post-Secondary Education created by Gov. Gary Locke. In 2006 College Success Foundation-District of Columbia (CSF-DC) was founded as a subsidiary  focusing on the District of Columbia, particularly in Wards 7 and 8. In 2007, the organization widened its focus to include college prep and support services for students beginning in middle school. , and changed its name to reflect its broader geographic mission.

Public School Districts
CSF advisors work directly in schools with high percentages of low-income students. CSF collaborates with school districts to improve high school graduation rates and increase the number of graduates going directly to college.

CSF works with these public school districts:
 Washington state public school districts: Auburn, Bremerton, Highline, Kent, Port Angeles, Seattle, Spokane, Tacoma, Yakima 
 District of Columbia public and charter school district: Ward 7, Ward 8

References

Educational foundations in the United States